Kajamānu (Akkadian: ka-ja-ma-nu "the constant") or Lubat-saguš (also Uduimin-saĝuš; Sumerian: LU.BAT SAG.UŠ, MULUDU.IMIN-saĝ-uš, "star of the sun") is the ancient Mesopotamian name for the planet Saturn. In ancient Mesopotamia, he was also regarded as the "star of Ninurta," the Mesopotamian fertility deity.

In other cultures
Kiwan (Mandaic for Saturn) is derived from the Mesopotamian name. Kayvan is the Persian equivalent name.

Kēwān (Classical Syriac: ܟܹܐܘܵܢ) also being a loan from Akkadian, is the name for Saturn in Syriac among later Assyrians.

See also
Kayvan
Kiwan
List of Mesopotamian deities
Ninurta
Remphan

References

Mesopotamian gods
Saturnian deities